Wani Lodu Swaka Lo Buluk (born 9 June 2001) is a Sudanese-Australian professional basketball player for the Illawarra Hawks of the National Basketball League (NBL). Opting to forgo college basketball in the United States to begin his professional career in Australia, he made his debut for the Perth Wildcats in the NBL in 2018. He won two NBL championships with the Wildcats over three years before joining the Sydney Kings in 2021 and winning a third championship in 2022. He also helped the Warwick Senators win the West Coast Classic in 2020.

Early life and career
Swaka Lo Buluk was born in Sudan and moved to Perth as a four-year-old. He attended La Salle College in Perth and then spent two years at the Australian Institute of Sport's NBA Global Academy in Canberra. He also attended Lake Ginninderra College while at the AIS.

Swaka Lo Buluk played two seasons in the South East Australian Basketball League (SEABL) with the BA Centre of Excellence. He averaged 2.4 points and 1.2 rebounds in 13 games in 2017 and then 1.6 points and 1.6 rebounds in five games in 2018.

At the 2018 Under 18 National Championships, he helped Western Australia win the title, the state's first since 2001, scoring 16 points in the gold medal game.

Professional career
In the lead-up to the 2018–19 NBL season, Swaka Lo Buluk played for the Perth Wildcats during the pre-season when a large portion of the squad was on international duties. In December 2018, he joined the Wildcats as a development player and became the youngest player to debut for the team at 17 years old. He also became the sixth youngest player in NBL history to score on debut. He played four games during the season and received minutes in Game 3 of the NBL Grand Final series against Melbourne United. He was a member of the Wildcats' championship-winning squad in March 2019. Following the season, he signed a scholarship agreement with California Baptist University.

For the 2019 SBL season, Swaka Lo Buluk joined the Warwick Senators. In 20 games, he averaged 12.1 points, 4.7 rebounds and 3.6 assists per game.

On 15 July 2019, Swaka Lo Buluk signed a three-year contract with the Wildcats, opting to forgo college basketball in the United States to begin his professional career in Australia. However, on 3 September 2019, he was ruled out for three to four months after injuring his right ankle at pre-season practice. He suffered a torn syndesmosis and underwent surgery. He returned from injury to make his 2019–20 season debut on 21 December against Melbourne. On 15 February 2020, in the Wildcats' regular-season finale, he made his first NBL start and recorded eight points and four rebounds in a 94–79 win over the Adelaide 36ers. In March 2020, he was crowned an NBL champion for the second year in a row. He averaged 1.9 points in 13 games during the season.

He re-joined the Warwick Senators in 2020 and helped them win the West Coast Classic. In the grand final, the Senators defeated the Perry Lakes Hawks 96–81, with Swaka Lo Buluk recording nine points and six rebounds. In 13 games, he averaged 10.0 points, 4.3 rebounds and 3.4 assists per game.

Swaka Lo Buluk missed pre-season action leading up to the 2020–21 NBL season due to a groin aggravation. He helped the Wildcats reach the 2021 NBL Grand Final series, where they lost 3–0 to Melbourne United. He averaged 1.3 points in 33 games during the season. The Wildcats decided to not take up the club option on his contract following the season, making him a free agent.

After playing for the Albury Wodonga Bandits in the NBL1 South, Swaka Lo Buluk joined the Sydney Kings for the 2021–22 NBL season, initially as an injury replacement player for Dejan Vasiljevic, before becoming an integral part of the squad. On 13 January 2022, he scored a career-high 17 points in a 97–89 loss to the Illawarra Hawks. He helped the Kings win the 2022 NBL championship.

For the 2022 NBL1 North season, Swaka Lo Buluk joined the USC Rip City. In 11 games, he averaged 12.55 points, 3.55 rebounds, 1.82 assists and 1.55 steals per game.

On 20 May 2022, Swaka Lo Buluk signed a two-year deal with the Illawarra Hawks.

National team career
In 2018, Swaka Lo Buluk represented Australia at the Under-17 FIBA World Cup in Argentina and won gold at the Under-16 FIBA Asia Championship in China. He was named in the all-tournament team for the U16 Asian Championship. In 2019, he played for Australia at the Under-19 FIBA World Cup in Greece.

In June 2022, Swaka Lo Buluk was named in the Boomers' World Cup Qualifiers team.

References

External links

NBL profile
FIBA profile

2001 births
Living people
Australian men's basketball players
Basketball players from Perth, Western Australia
Illawarra Hawks players
People educated at La Salle College, Perth
People educated at Lake Ginninderra College
Perth Wildcats players
Shooting guards
Small forwards
Sydney Kings players
Sudanese emigrants to Australia
Sportsmen from Western Australia
Australian Institute of Sport basketball players